Shobara Dam  is a gravity dam located in Hiroshima Prefecture in Japan. The dam is used for flood control and water supply. The catchment area of the dam is 4.2 km2. The dam impounds about 6  ha of land when full and can store 701 thousand cubic meters of water. The construction of the dam was started on 1994 and completed in 2015.

References

Dams in Hiroshima Prefecture